Eduards Žukovs (born 21 January 1972) is a Latvian wrestler. He competed in the men's freestyle 62 kg at the 1992 Summer Olympics.

References

1972 births
Living people
Latvian male sport wrestlers
Olympic wrestlers of Latvia
Wrestlers at the 1992 Summer Olympics
Sportspeople from Daugavpils